The All-SEC football team is an annual Southeastern Conference (SEC) honor bestowed on the best players in the conference following every college football season.

Seasons
Following is a list of all-conference teams in the history of the SEC:

 1933 All-SEC football team
 1934 All-SEC football team
 1935 All-SEC football team
 1936 All-SEC football team
 1937 All-SEC football team
 1938 All-SEC football team
 1939 All-SEC football team
 1940 All-SEC football team
 1941 All-SEC football team
 1942 All-SEC football team
 1943 All-SEC football team
 1944 All-SEC football team
 1945 All-SEC football team
 1946 All-SEC football team
 1947 All-SEC football team
 1948 All-SEC football team
 1949 All-SEC football team
 1950 All-SEC football team
 1951 All-SEC football team
 1952 All-SEC football team
 1953 All-SEC football team
 1954 All-SEC football team
 1955 All-SEC football team
 1956 All-SEC football team
 1957 All-SEC football team
 1958 All-SEC football team
 1959 All-SEC football team
 1960 All-SEC football team
 1961 All-SEC football team
 1962 All-SEC football team
 1963 All-SEC football team
 1964 All-SEC football team
 1965 All-SEC football team
 1966 All-SEC football team
 1967 All-SEC football team
 1968 All-SEC football team
 1969 All-SEC football team
 1970 All-SEC football team
 1971 All-SEC football team
 1972 All-SEC football team
 1973 All-SEC football team
 1974 All-SEC football team
 1975 All-SEC football team
 1976 All-SEC football team
 1977 All-SEC football team
 1978 All-SEC football team
 1979 All-SEC football team
 1980 All-SEC football team
 1981 All-SEC football team
 1982 All-SEC football team
 1983 All-SEC football team
 1984 All-SEC football team
 1985 All-SEC football team
 1986 All-SEC football team
 1987 All-SEC football team
 1988 All-SEC football team
 1989 All-SEC football team
 1990 All-SEC football team
 1991 All-SEC football team
 1992 All-SEC football team
 1993 All-SEC football team
 1994 All-SEC football team
 1995 All-SEC football team
 1996 All-SEC football team
 1997 All-SEC football team
 1998 All-SEC football team
 1999 All-SEC football team
 2000 All-SEC football team
 2001 All-SEC football team
 2002 All-SEC football team
 2003 All-SEC football team
 2004 All-SEC football team
 2005 All-SEC football team
 2006 All-SEC football team
 2007 All-SEC football team
 2008 All-SEC football team
 2009 All-SEC football team
 2010 All-SEC football team
 2011 All-SEC football team
 2012 All-SEC football team
 2013 All-SEC football team
 2014 All-SEC football team
 2015 All-SEC football team
 2016 All-SEC football team
 2017 All-SEC football team
 2018 All-SEC football team
 2019 All-SEC football team
 2020 All-SEC football team
 2021 All-SEC football team